Minimalism: A Bridge between Classical Philosophy and the Baha'i Revelation is a book by William S. Hatcher, published in 2004. Hatcher attempts to prove God's existence while addressing many of the criticisms raised against previous theistic philosophers.

References

External links
 Juxta.com.

Religious studies books
Bahá'í studies texts